The Nunnery Hill Incline  was a funicular in Allegheny City, Pennsylvania, in what is now the Fineview neighborhood of Pittsburgh. Designed by Samuel Diescher, it operated from 1888 until 1895 between its base station on Federal Street to its upper station on the currently named Meadville Street. It was one of a few inclines with a curve in the track. The name of the hill derived from a short-lived settlement of Poor Clares earlier in the century.

The incline suspended operations without warning on 13 September 1895, to the consternation of many of the hill's residents. It did not resume business. By 1901, it was being dismantled.

Remnants of the incline, namely the red brick lower station and a stone retaining wall along Henderson Street, have been subject to preservation efforts. Both structures received City of Pittsburgh historic designations in 2011.

See also
List of funicular railways
List of inclines in Pittsburgh

References

Railway inclines in Pittsburgh
Defunct funicular railways in the United States
Railway lines opened in 1888
1888 establishments in Pennsylvania
1895 disestablishments in Pennsylvania
City of Pittsburgh historic designations